Boxtel is a municipality and a town in the southern Netherlands. The name derives from Buchestelle and is presumably a combination of 'stelle' (Dutch for stable, safe place) and (deer) buck.

This is the origin of the Van Boxtel family, which has numerous descendants in North Brabant.

The town was the site of the Battle of Boxtel fought in September 1794 during the Flanders campaign. It is often principally remembered as the first battle of the future Duke of Wellington.

Population centres 
Boxtel
Esch
Lennisheuvel
Liempde

Topography

Dutch topographic map of the municipality of Boxtel, 2021

Notable residents 

 José van Dijck (born 1960) a new media author and academic
 Teun Voeten (born 1961) a Dutch photojournalist and cultural anthropologist
 Marcel Wanders (born 1963) a Dutch designer and art director
 Dianne van Giersbergen (born 1985 in Liempde) a spinto soprano and singer-songwriter
 Sam Feldt (born 1993) a Dutch DJ and record producer

Sport 
 Jeroen Delmee (born 1973) a field hockey player and twice Olympic champion
 Bas van Erp (1979–2016) a Dutch wheelchair Paralympic tennis player
 Frank van der Struijk (born 1985) a Dutch footballer with over 300 club caps
 Michael van Gerwen (born 1989) a Dutch professional, 3-time World Darts Champion
 Glenn Schuurman (born 1991) a Dutch field hockey player, competed at the 2016 Summer Olympics
 Silvinho Esajas (born 2002) a Dutch professional footballer

Transportation
Boxtel railway station

Economy

Vion NV, one of the largest European meat processors, is headquartered in Boxtel and operates it's largest pig slaughterhouse there.

Gallery

References

External links

Official website

 
Municipalities of North Brabant
Populated places in North Brabant